The Kingdom of Majorca (1231–1715) was created by James I of Aragon following his conquest in 1229 and the subsequent surrender of sovereignty by the Muslim rulers of the Balearic Islands in 1231.  It was ruled in conjunction with the Crown of Aragon until his death when by will it passed to a younger son, James (II), who ruled the kingdom as nominal vassal of the Aragonese Crown.  He was removed by his nephew Alfonso III of Aragon, who conquered the island of Menorca in 1287, effectively recovered Menorca from Moorish rule. 
By the Treaty of Anagni of 1295, however, these island territories were yielded back to James. In 1344, the kingdom was again united with the Crown of Aragon but still disputed by pretenders until 1403. It subsequently formed an administrative kingdom within the Crown of Spain periodically included in the royal style  as in Philip II's in the 1584 Treaty of Joinville  until the Nueva Planta Decrees abolished these divisions in 1715.

Monarchs of Majorca

Pretenders to the throne
Peter IV of Aragon annexed the kingdom in 1344 and the title was part of the Crown of Aragon, though disputed by pretenders.

Isabel's descendants did not continue the pretension.

See also
List of consorts of Majorca
List of Spanish monarchs
Kings of Spain family tree
Kingdom of Majorca

 
Majorca, Kings of
Majorca, Kings of
Majorca, Kings of
Majorca
Monarchs, Majorca